() is a sum (district) of Govisümber Province in central Mongolia. In 2014, its population was 3,198.

Transport
The town is served by a railway station on the Trans-Mongolian Railway.

Gallery

References

Districts of Govisümber Province